Appunia is a genus of flowering plants in the family Rubiaceae. It was described by Joseph Dalton Hooker in 1873. The genus is found from southern Mexico, Central America, and northern South America.

Species

 Appunia aurantiaca (K.Krause) Sandwith - Roraima
 Appunia brachycalyx (Bremek.) Steyerm. - Guyana, Suriname, French Guiana
 Appunia calycina (Benth.) Sandwith - Guyana
 Appunia debilis Sandwith - Guyana
 Appunia guatemalensis Donn. - Guatemala, Belize, Honduras, Nicaragua, Costa Rica, Chiapas, Tabasco, Veracruz
 Appunia longipedunculata (Steyerm.) Delprete - Colombia, Venezuela 
 Appunia megalantha C.M.Taylor & Lorence - Colombia, Perú
 Appunia odontocalyx Sandwith - Bolivia
 Appunia peduncularis (Kunth) Delprete - Venezuela, Brazil
 Appunia seibertii Standl. - Panamá, Colombia Ecuador
 Appunia surinamensis (Bremek.) Steyerm. - Suriname
 Appunia tenuiflora (Benth.) B.D.Jacks. - French Guiana, Suriname, Guyana, Venezuela, Bolivia, Colombia, Perú, northern Brazil 
 Appunia triphylla Ducke - Brazil
 Appunia venezuelensis Steyerm. - Venezuela

References

External links
Appunia in the World Checklist of Rubiaceae

Rubiaceae genera
Morindeae
Flora of Central America
Flora of South America
Taxa named by Joseph Dalton Hooker